The 147th district of the Texas House of Representatives contains parts of Houston. The district is currently vacant. The most recent Representative was Garnet Coleman, who had represented the district since 1991.

References 

147